Argyranthemum maderense, called the Madeira marguerite, is a species of flowering plant in the genus Argyranthemum. In spite of its scientific and common names it is not native to Madeira, but to Lanzarote in the Canary Islands some 500 km away. It has gained the Royal Horticultural Society's Award of Garden Merit.

References

Glebionidinae
Flora of Lanzarote
Garden plants
Plants described in 1976